Rilla may refer to:

Rilla (footballer) (born 1982), Brazilian footballer
Rilla Askew (born 1951), American writer
Walter Rilla (1894–1980), German actor
Wolf Rilla (1920–2005), German film director

See also
Rilla of Ingleside, a 1921 novel in the Anne of Green Gables series
Rilla Mill, a village in Cornwall, England